Ames Academy Building is a historic school building located at Ames, Montgomery County, New York.  It was built in 1835 and is a two-story, rectangular, gable roofed, stone masonry building five bays long and two bays wide.  The walls are constructed of cut limestone blocks.  The Ames Academy received a charter from the New York State Board of Regents on February 5, 1839.  It was used as a school until 1959.  Since 1987 it has housed a local history museum.

It was added to the National Register of Historic Places in 2002.

References

School buildings on the National Register of Historic Places in New York (state)
School buildings completed in 1835
Museums in Montgomery County, New York
History museums in New York (state)
National Register of Historic Places in Montgomery County, New York